Karen Peck and New River is a southern gospel mixed group based in Gainesville, Georgia.

Music career

The youngest of three daughters, Karen was exposed to the traditional sounds of gospel music at a very early age. Her parents often took Karen and her sisters, Susan and Sandra, to the all-night sings in Atlanta. These concerts left an indelible mark on the youngsters who made a pact to someday share a musical ministry of their own.

One of the groups often featured at the Atlanta concerts was The Lefevres, who later became known as The Nelons. Karen had aspirations of singing with the Nelons.  In 1981, Karen was invited to travel with them, and remained in the group for 10 years. 

Finally in 1991, Karen and her sister, Susan, with Karen's husband Rickey, organized the musical entourage of Karen Peck and New River. Today the New River team consists vocally of Karen, Susan, and Jeff Hawes.  Additionally, Karen's husband, Rickey, serves as the group's road manager and sound technician. Susan's husband, David, is the founder and owner of the Jackson Steel Guitar Company.

Karen Peck and New River have garnered 11 Favorite Soprano Fan Awards from the readers of The Singing News Magazine, Southern Gospel Music's leading fan and trade publication. Karen and group have also received many awards from other magazine publications and Internet publications. They have had five consecutive No. 1 songs in southern gospel music.

The group have appeared on such prestigious stages as The Grand Ole Opry, The Gaither Homecoming concerts, Opryland Theme Park, Dollywood and Six Flags Over Georgia. Over the past decade, they have been featured on many television networks, with appearances on programs such as TBN's Praise The Lord, and the Grand Ole Opry Live. The group has enjoyed many honors and accolades.

Their album "Journey of Joy" received a Grammy nomination for 2008. "Journey of Joy" was also nominated for three Dove Awards. This album has three consecutive No. 1 songs: "Hey", "Last Night", and "Whispered Prayers". A few of their other popular hits include: "Why Can't All God's Children Get Along", "I Want to Thank You", "Hold Me While I Cry", "Just One Touch", "I Wanna Know How It Feels", "God Likes To Work", "Daddy’s Home", "When Jesus Passes By", "God Still Answers Prayer", and "Christian In The House". Additionally, the group’s number one hit, "Four Days Late", was also named Song of the Year by readers of The Singing New Magazine in 2001 and the SGMA Awards and continues to be a favorite among audiences.

In September 2008, Daywind released Ephesians One. The album, featured the No. 1 song "I Want To Thank You", which was nominated for a Grammy in 2009. In 2009, Daywind released their album "No Worries, and in 2010, the DVD/CD "Live at Oak Tree" was nominated for a 2010 Grammy Award (their third Grammy nomination). July 2011 brought the release of "Reach Out". "Each time we go into the studio to record a new album," Karen shares, "we're at a different place in our walk with Christ than the last time we prepared for a recording. Therefore, obviously, each recording pulls at a different heart string, yet the message of hope is always present. That's what life in Christ is all about. As a result of various circumstances each of us have faced over the past years, we're at a point in our lives where we realize that anything we achieve or accomplish is all because of Christ. It is an honor to serve Him."

Members
Karen Peck Gooch (born March 12, 1960), soprano, 1991–present
Susan Peck Jackson (born February 4, 1957), alto (Karen's sister) 1991–present
Kari Gooch 2015–Present
Grant Gibson 2017-Present

Former
Ricky Braddy 2015-2017
Jeff Hawes, tenor, 2010–2015
David White (tenor) 1991–1993, 1994–1999
Eric Morris (tenor) 1993–1994
John Rowsey (tenor) 1999–2002
Jason Jackson (tenor) 2002–2004
Paul Lancaster (tenor) 2004
Devin McGlamery (tenor) 2004–2009

Discography
1991: Karen Peck and New River
1992: Restoration
1993: Daddy's Home
1994: Alabama Live
1995: Unlimited
1996: Right on Time
1997: Makin' a Difference
1999: Turn It Loose
2000: A Taste of Grace
2001: Triumph
2003: For His Glory
2004: Faith, Hope, & Love
2005: Good to Be Free
2007: Journey of Joy
2008: Ephesians One
2009: No Worries
2010: Live at Oak Tree
2011: Reach Out
2013: Revival
2015: Pray Now
2017: Hope For All Nations
2020: Lift His Name
2022: 2:22

Karen Peck Solo Albums
1989: My Father's Words
1996 Carry Faith
2012: How You Walk the Miles

Compilations
2000: A Southern Gospel Decade
2007: The Best of Karen Peck and New River
2016: 25 Anniversary - Collectors Edition

Singles
Singing News Magazine Top 40 Singles
1992: "Why Can't All God's Children Get Along" No. 2
1993: "God Answers Prayer" No. 4
1993: "Rain & Shine" No. 2
1993: "When Jesus Passes By" No. 2
1993: "Whenever the Wind Blows" No. 22
1994: "Daddy's Home" No. 6
1994: "He's Sending Miracles" No. 6
1995: "God Likes to Work" No. 1
1996: "Ten Thousand Angels Cried" No. 13
1999: "Christian in the House" No. 33
1999: "UFO" No. 19
2001: "Four Days Late" No. 1
2001: "The Truth Is" No. 24
2002: "I Wanna Know How It Feels" No. 3
2003: "Now That You Know" No. 14
2003: "Rejoice in the Lord" No. 27
2004: "That's Why They Call It Grace" No. 6
2005: "Get About God's Business" No. 11
2005: "Just One Touch" No. 3
2006: "River of Peace" No. 8
2006: "Hold Me While I Cry" No. 1
2007: "Last Night" No. 1
2008: "Hey" No. 1
2008: "Whispered Prayers" No. 1
2009: "I Want to Thank You" No. 1
2009: "Ephesians Chapter One" No. 9
2010: "Why Can't All God's Children Get Along" No. 2
2010: "Why Should I Worry" No. 4
2011: "On the Banks of the Promised Land" No. 1
2011: "Special Love" No. 8
2012: "Mighty Big God" No. 1
2012: "Good Things Are Happening" No. 2
2013: "Sustaining Grace" No. 8
2014: "Revival" No. 1
2014: "Finish Well" No. 1
2015: "Everybody's Going Through Something" No. 2
2015: "Pray Now" No. 1
2016: "I Am Blessed" No. 2
2017: "Calling" No. 1

Awards
Absolutely Gospel (SGN) Music Award
2002: Progressive Song of the Year – "Four Days Late"
2002: Song of the Year – "Four Days Late"
2003: Female Vocalist of the Year
2004: Progressive Song of the Year – "That's Why They Call It Grace"
2006: Progressive Album of the Year – Good To Be Free
2008: Progressive Album of the Year – Journey of Joy
2008: Progressive Song of the Year – "Last Night"
2009: Country/Bluegrass Song of the Year – "Hey"
2010: Country Song of the Year – "I Want to Thank You"
2010: Fan Favorite Artist of the Year
2010: Progressive Album of the Year – No Worries
2010: Song of the Year – "I Want to Thank You"
2011: Fan Favorite Artist of the Year
2011: Female Vocalist of the Year
2011: Mixed Group of the Year
2011: Progressive Song of the Year – "Why Can't All God's Children Get Along"
2012: Fan Favorite Artist of the Year
2012: Mixed Group of the Year
2012: Progressive Song of the Year – "On the Banks of the Promised Land"
2012: Song of the Year – "On the Banks of the Promised Land"
2012: Susan Unthank Memorial Award – Karen Peck Gooch
2013: Album of the Year – How You Walk the Miles (Karen Peck solo recording)
2013: Song of the Year – "Mighty Big God"

Singing News Fan Awards
Favorite Soprano for 11 Consecutive Years
Favorite Female Vocalist for 18 Consecutive Years

Diamond Awards
1992: Sunrise Award Recipient
2005: Trio of the Year
2009: Song of the Year – "Whispered Prayers"
2009: Album of the Year – Ephesians One
2009: Mixed Group of the Year

Southern Gospel Music Fan Fair Awards
2001: Song of the year – "Four Days Late"
2002: Female Vocalist of the Year
2004/05/06: Female Vocalist of the Year 
2007: Favorite Alto – Susan Peck Jackson
2007: Favorite Soprano
2007: Song of the Year – "Hold Me While I Cry"
2007: Trio of the Year
2009: Favorite Soprano
2009: Trio of the Year

Gospel Music Hall of Fame
2018 Inductee

References

External links 

Interview with Karen Peck
YouTube

Southern gospel performers
American Christian musical groups
Musical groups established in 1991
Musical groups from Georgia (U.S. state)
1991 establishments in Georgia (U.S. state)